Stella's oorlog (Dutch for Stella's war) is a 2009 Dutch drama film directed by Diederik van Rooijen.

Cast 

 Javier Guzman as Jurre
 Thijs Römer as Sander
 Teun Kuilboer as Twan Zwart
 Juda Goslinga as Gees
 Micha Hulshof as Dani
 Anna Drijver as Sita
 Maartje Remmers as Stella
 Keesje Rietvelt as Iris

References

External links 
 

2009 films
2000s Dutch-language films
Dutch drama films
Films directed by Diederik van Rooijen
2009 drama films